Aksyon is a Philippine television news broadcasting show broadcast by TV5. Originally anchored by Paolo Bediones, Cheryl Cosim and Erwin Tulfo, it premiered on April 5, 2010, on the network's evening line up replacing TEN: The Evening News. The show concluded on March 13, 2020. Luchi Cruz-Valdes and Ed Lingao served as the final anchors. It was replaced by Frontline Pilipinas in its timeslot.

Background
The newscast is based on News5's slogan "Higit sa Balita, Aksyon!", which literally means "Beyond the news, Action".

History

As a primetime newscast (2010–2014) 
Aksyon premiered on April 5, 2010, at 9:00 PM with Paolo Bediones and Cheryl Cosim as its first anchors. The news program used a touch-screen television called "Aksyon Board". It is the first local newscast to report via Live-Pack in contrast to the OB Vans used by its competitors. There is also a round-up news update called Aksyon Ngayon formerly anchored by Dindo Flora, Cristina Lazo, and former Tambayan 101.9 (now MOR 101.9) DJ Reggie Valdez.

On December 23, 2013, Aksyon, along with other News5 programs, transferred from its former TV5 Studio Complex in Novaliches, Quezon City to a larger TV5 Media Center in Reliance, Mandaluyong.

Expansion (2014–2017) 
On July 15, 2016, Cherie Mercado left the newscast after six years with TV5 (from Aksyon Weekend, Aksyon JournalisMO, Pilipinas News, to Aksyon sa Tanghali), after she was appointed as the Press Officer and spokesperson to the newly created Department of Transportation. She, went to a private life with her family after resigning from her post in May the following year. In 2018, she was hired by CNN Philippines (a local franchise of CNN which, ironically, became TV5's former partner in sharing international news content via AksyonTV's defunct CNN Konek) to anchor the late evening edition of Newsroom, replacing Mitzi Borromeo who'll leave the channel to pursue an advance degree in college.

Following her departure, Aksyon was downgraded to single-presenter format by August 1. Cheryl Cosim retained her role to the morning newscast, but she left her co-presenter of Aksyon Tonite Ed Lingao who went solo for a week until Roices Naguit took over Cosim's vacated anchor's chair on the Late Night Edition in the height of the network's coverage to the 2016 Summer Olympics in Rio de Janeiro, Brazil. More than two months later, on October 17, the edition's segment anchor Lia Cruz and former Aksyon sa Tanghali segment anchor Marga Vargas are named as new rotating co-anchors to Lingao. The primetime edition however, was spared from these changes and continued to be co-anchored by Valdez and Tulfo during the time.

On March 31, 2017, Erwin Tulfo and News5 management reached an agreement for the former to left Aksyon Prime, leaving his radio program Punto Asintado the remaining News5 program he hosted on, as well as occasional appearances with his brother Ben Tulfo for Kilos Pronto (a blocktime public-service show produced by Bitag Media for government-owned PTV). Although personal concerns were the main reason for his departure to the newscast, several rumors have surrounded that it was due to his strong opinion stance leaning towards President Rodrigo Duterte, which was deemed sensitive to tackle for most Filipinos, particularly to members of the media (such as criticizing anti-Duterte supporter Jim Paredes on the DDS rally in Luneta during the 31st anniversary of EDSA I and Ed Lingao's criticisms to his opinion about opposition Sen. Risa Hontiveros interview with UNTV's Get It Straight with Daniel Razon regarding the ongoing crisis in Marawi that has been a subject of "fake news"). Tulfo finally left TV5 on June 29, a day after Valdes returned from a month-long vacation. His brother Ben, meanwhile, revealed that she had been uncomfortable to work with Tulfo, which could have led to his departure with the network. As a result of the online word war, TV5 was "disappointed" and gave disciplinary action on Ed, Erwin and Ben on June 30, with details not being revealed to the public. On July 16, Tulfo was appointed to the public radio station Radyo Pilipinas One for his own radio program, Erwin Tulfo Live which began the following day. Few months later, on September 17, Tulfo was also named as PTV's full-time news anchor, presenting the flagship PTV News which also began the following day.

Reformat and major changes made by ESPN5's launch (2017–2020) 
On October 12, 2017, TV5 announced its partnership agreement between the network and US-based sports television network ESPN, who returned to Philippine television after a 5-year long hiatus. Thus the former Sports5 rebranded as ESPN5 a day after, during the coverage of Game 1 of the 2017 PBA Governor's Cup Finals between the Barangay Ginebra San Miguel and the Meralco Bolts. The new sports deal showed drastic changes within News5 and Aksyon: Aksyon sa Umaga was axed for good on November 3 to give way for the upcoming ESPN US' primetime programming simulcast overnight. This ended Cheryl Cosim's role as the main anchor of a News5 newscast after 7 years, although she continues radio duties at Radyo5 as well as filling-in for Cruz-Valdes on the primetime edition. Weekend Aksyon News Alert bulletins were also axed as part of the sports division's expansion. Also, since November 6, during daylight saving time, Aksyon sa Tanghali adjusted its timeslot to 12:30 PM, every Monday, Tuesday, & Friday (to accommodate live coverage of the US National Football League) with a more public service focus along with reading the day's Main Headlines. Aksyon Tonite also cutback its airtime to 15 minutes by November 6. Presenter changes in the newscast also occurred, as Lia Cruz left the newscast three days earlier to join ESPN5's new on air talents, while Marga Vargas moved back to Aksyon sa Tanghali a week after; leaving Ed Lingao as the main solo presenter for the newscast.

Correspondents
Aside from reporting on Aksyon, the following correspondents occasionally file reports for Radyo5 92.3 News FM as well as Cignal TV's satellite TV news channels One News and One PH.

 Marlene Alcaide
 Ryan Ang
 Gem Avanceña
 Jen Calimon
 Carlo Castillo
 Naomi Dayrit
 Jenny Dongon
 Marianne Enriquez
 Zony Esguerra
 Dindo Flora
 Shyla Francisco
 Maricel Halili
 Gary de Leon
 Romel Lopez
 Mae Ann Los Baños
 Patricia Mangune
 MJ Marfori
 Faith del Mundo
 Justinne Punsalang
 Roices Naguit-Sibal
 Lyn Olavario
 Renz Ongkiko
 Laila "Chikadora" Pangilinan
 Gerard de la Peña
 Bim Santos
 Hannibal Talete
 Faye Tobias
 Dale de Vera
 Bev Verdera
 Greg Gregorio
 JC Cosico
 Ria Fernandez
 Jennifer Reyes

Note
Absorbed from News5 Davao/Aksyon Dabaw
Full-time correspondent for One News
Also a correspondent for One Sports's SportsCenter Philippines

Regional and affiliate versions / adaptations
Aksyon also had two regional versions: Aksyon Bisaya, a late afternoon regional newscast aired on TV5 Cebu, launched on July 18, 2011, following the station's launch in Cebu; and Aksyon Dabaw, which was launched on May 5, 2014, on TV5 Davao. These were the only regional editions that TV5 managed to produce, since they did not have a regional newscast for years in the network's history.

However, on September 8, 2016, the two regional newscasts were cancelled due to cost-cutting measures by the network to sustain the day-by-day operations of these regional stations. Although the newscast was ended, the reporters and cameramen were remaining employed and they will continue to give reports for all national Aksyon newscasts and for Radyo5.

Although it didn't consolidate with Aksyon, Golden Broadcast Professionals DXGB-11 Zamboanga, a TV5 affiliate, adopted the soundtrack of the newscast for the station's flagship Dateline Zamboanga which its only the 2014 version.

Former editions

Aksyon JournalisMO

See also
List of programs aired by TV5 (Philippine TV network)
List of programs aired by AksyonTV/5 Plus

References

External links
 

TV5 (Philippine TV network) news shows
Philippine television news shows
TV5 (Philippine TV network) original programming
2020s Philippine television series
2010 Philippine television series debuts
2020 Philippine television series endings
Filipino-language television shows
Flagship evening news shows
Sign language television shows